The so-called Bars of Aragon, Royal sign of Aragon, Royal arms of Aragon, Four Bars, Red Bars or Coat of arms of the Crown of Aragon, which bear four red pallets on gold background, depicts the familiar coat of the Kings of Aragon. It differs from the flag because this latter instead uses bars. It is one of the oldest coats of arms in Europe dating back to a seal of Raymond Berengar IV, Count of Barcelona and Prince of Aragon, from 1150.

Today, this symbol has been adopted and/or included in their arms by several former territories related to the Crown of Aragon, like the arms of Spain, which wears it in its third quarter (whereas the Kings of Spain are heirs of those of Aragon); or the arms of Andorra, which shows it on two of its quarters. It is also the main element of the arms of the present Spanish autonomous communities of Catalonia, Valencian Community and the Balearic Islands; the fourth quarter of the Spanish autonomous community of Aragon; it is present on the arms of the French administrative regions of Provence-Alpes-Côte d'Azur and Occitania (whose department of the Pyrénées-Orientales regroups the old provinces of Roussillon and Upper Cerdanya); and in the Italian provinces of Reggio Calabria and Catanzaro in Calabria, and Lecce in Apulia. It figures also in numerous located municipal blazons in the former territories of the Crown, either by explicit concession of the king, or because they were cities or towns of realengo (that is, directly dependent on the Crown and subject to no kind of manorialism); and others outside it, in which case the symbol is because of the presence of the king or knights of the Crown at some moment of their local history.

Heraldic description
 
The blazon of the arms is: Or, four pallets of gules. In heraldry, the escutcheon is commonly known as that of the of Aragon.

These pallets of gules are commonly named in popular usage and culture as the "red bars" or the "four bars".

It has been described on the Middle Ages armorials as in "Armorial du Hérault Vermandois", 1285–1300, as that of the King of Aragon, naming specifically Peter III as one of the bearers, is described as These are the arms of the Counts of Barcelona who acquired Aragón by marriage (...), the one of Count of Barcelona is the same or three pallets gules, the arms of the King of Majorca are those of Aragon, with the coat of arms of James II, King of Majorca being or four pallets gules a bend azure and the one of the King of Ternacle d Aragon et Ternacle en flanquiet lun dedans lautre (...) Per pale or four pallets gules and argent (...). The coat of arms with the four red pales on a gold background appears on several other coats of arms, named as "of Aragon".

Also mentioned in Armorial de Gelre, 1370–1395, the coat of arms of Peter IV Die Coninc v[on] Arragoen is golden with four pallers of gulets or the Armorial d'Urfé, 1380, sont les armes de le Conte de Cathalogne, and in armorial de Charolais, 1425, arms conte de Barselongne and armorial Le Blanq (sources from 1420 to 1450) venant des contes de Barselone, armorial Wijnbergen, King of Aragon or four pallets gules

History

Originally it was the familiar emblem of the Kings of Aragon and Counts of Barcelona. In 1137, when Aragon and the County of Barcelona merged by dynastic union by the marriage of Raymond Berengar IV of Barcelona and Petronila of Aragon, these titles were finally borne by only one person when their son Alfonso II of Aragon ascended to the throne in 1162. Slowly the various entities and territories over which the House of Aragon-Barcelona ruled and came to rule came to be called the Crown of Aragon.

"The new ruler of the united dynasty (Raymond Berenger IV of Barcelona) called himself count of Barcelona and "prince" of Aragón."

The son of Ramon Berenguer IV and Petronila, Alfonso II, inherited both the titles of King of Aragon and Count of Barcelona, in a style that would be maintained by all its successors to the crown. Thus, this union was made while respecting the existing institutions and parliaments of both territories.

It constitutes the third quarter section of the coat of arms of the Kingdom of Spain.

Theories of origin

Theories of Catalan origin
The oldest evidence where the arms can be seen is from 1150, in a seal of Ramon Berenguer IV, Count of Barcelona. The seal evidence is disputed by some Aragonese authors who claim that the first documented evidence dates from the reign of Alfonso II, king of Aragon and count of Barcelona.

As a pre-heraldic symbol, the red bars on a yellow background are found on the Romanesque tombs of Barcelona's Count Ramon Berenguer II Cap d'estopes, who died in 1082, and his great-grandmother Ermessenda, who died in 1058, wife of Count Ramon Borrell I, both of whose tombs were at the portico of the old Romanesque Cathedral of Girona; it is not sure that the 15 bars of gold appearing in a painting are contemporary to the tombs. It is a proof that relates the arms to the Counts of Barcelona lineage and the pre-heraldic forms indicate pre-heraldic times, before the second third of the 12th century.

Theories of Aragonese origin
The exact origin of the four bars symbol is obscure, and for long it has been explained by legends, now proven false. The first undisputed evidences are from the Alfonso II (king of Aragon and count of Barcelona) reign.

Even though a purely Aragonese origin for the four bars symbol has been proposed, the main point held by Aragonese authors (Fatás, Ubieto, Montaner), partially supported by some Catalan historians like Ferran de Segarra, is that the key evidence for the Catalan origin, the Marseilles seals, is dubious. The lines in the monochrome Marseilles seals are interpreted as mere scratchings by some, and as representation of a shield reinforcement by others. This theory was rejected by Aragonese member of the International Heraldry Academy Faustino Menéndez-Pidal.

A second point put forward by Aragonese authors is that Ramon Berenguer IV, Count of Barcelona was the de facto ruler of Aragon, even if only his son Alfonso II would become de jure king of Aragon. Therefore, any symbol associated with Ramon Berenguer IV can also be attributed to the then budding Crown of Aragon.

Variations

Arms of Sovereign States

Arms of modern administrative Regions
The Bars can be seen in the arms of several administrative divisions of Spain, France and Italy, all of them former territories of the Crown of Aragon.

Arms of Cities

See also

Bat (heraldry)
Coat of arms of Spain
Heraldry of Castile
Heraldry of León
Senyera
Spanish heraldry

Notes

References
 Retrieved on 9 September 2007.
 Retrieved on 9 September 2007.
 Retrieved on 9 September 2007.
 Retrieved on 9 September 2007.
 Retrieved on 9 September 2007.

External links
"The Coat of Arms of Catalonia" by the Catalan Genealogical Society 
"Kind of crown" by the Catalan Genealogical Society 
"The Four Bars", from personal to territorial symbolism, illustrated article by Gabriel Bibiloni 

Spanish coats of arms
Coats of arms of former countries
Coats of arms with pales
Royal arms of European monarchs